Adam Richard Kay (born 12 June 1980) is a British comedy writer, author, screenwriter, comedian and former doctor. His television writing credits include Crims, Mrs. Brown's Boys and Mitchell and Webb. He is best known as author of the number-one bestselling book This Is Going to Hurt.

Early life 
Kay was born to Stewart and Naomi Kay and grew up in a Jewish household with a sister, Sophie, and brother, Philip Kaye. His father being a doctor, he describes becoming a doctor as being a default decision. The Kay family was from Poland, the original family name being Strykowski.

Kay attended Dulwich College, leaving in 1997, and Imperial College London, where he read medicine and graduated in 2004. During his time at medical school, Kay 
began performing in medical school shows in 1998. While at medical school, he founded the musical comedy group Amateur Transplants and wrote for BBC Radio 4.

Career

Medicine
Similar to his brother Philip, Kay worked as a doctor between 2004 and 2010, leaving the profession after a patient's caesarean section was complicated by an undiagnosed placenta praevia; the expectant mother was subsequently taken to the intensive care unit, while the baby was delivered stillborn. The mother also died. Kay worked for a number of years as an obstetrics and gynaecology trainee, writing textbooks on the subject, before leaving medicine for a career in writing. Kay worked alongside his brother Philip at Queen's Medical Centre in Nottingham for a brief 6 months, however, left seeking a different challenge.

He regained his licence to practise medicine for two years from 2020 to 2022.

Music
Kay founded the Amateur Transplants. Their song "London Underground", which was set to the tune of "Going Underground" by The Jam, gained significant popularity on the internet in the UK in 2005.

Writing
Kay's first book, This Is Going to Hurt, based on diaries from his former career as a doctor, was published by Picador in September 2017 and became an instant Sunday Times bestseller. The paperback edition was also an instant Sunday Times number one bestseller, a position it held for well over a year and selling over one million copies. It was the book of the year in the UK's 2018 National Book Awards. The book was well received by critics, including in the literary pages of The Times, Financial Times, Guardian, and The Scotsman. 

In addition to book of the year, it also won at the National Book Awards in the categories of Non-Fiction Book of the Year, New Writer of the Year and Book Club Book of the Year. It was also awarded Blackwell's Debut Book of the Year 2017, Sunday Times Humour Book of the Year, and won both non-fiction book of the year and the overall prize in the 2017 Books Are My Bag Readers' Awards. It was nominated for Non-Fiction book of the year in the 2018 British Book Awards, won Esquire Book of the Year and was a selection of the Zoe Ball Book Club. It has been translated into 28 languages, achieving number-one status internationally. It was the UK's second-best selling book of 2018. On 6 July 2018, the BBC announced that Kay would be adapting This Is Going to Hurt as a seven-part comedy-drama for BBC One. It was made by Sister Pictures and Kay is one of the co-executive producers. Part one of the series, also titled This Is Going to Hurt, was broadcast on 8 February 2022.

Kay's second book, Twas the Nightshift before Christmas, was released in October 2019.

Kay is now an established screenwriter, having written and co-created the 2015 BBC Three sitcom series Crims – along with Grandma's House writer Dan Swimer, with other television work as a writer and script editor including Mrs. Brown's Boys, Mongrels, Watson & Oliver, Up the Women, Very British Problems, Flat TV, Our Ex Wife, Who Is America?, Mitchell and Webb and Child Genius.

In April 2020, it was announced that Trapeze would publish a collection of personal stories about the National Health Service (NHS) edited by Kay. Entitled Dear NHS: 100 Stories to Say Thank You, the book will include letters from stars including Sir Paul McCartney, Louis Theroux, Caitlin Moran and Jameela Jamil.

Since 2020, he has written and released several children's books.

In 2022, he published Undoctored: The Story of a Medic Who Ran Out of Patients.

Performing
Kay has sold out for six years at the Edinburgh Festival Fringe and has also had sell-out nationwide UK tours. His 2018 tour of This Is Going to Hurt sold out a season at the EICC, the largest venue of the Edinburgh Fringe and a week at the Garrick Theatre, before culminating in two shows at the Hammersmith Apollo. He performs regularly at music festivals including Latitude, and cultural events such as Cheltenham Literature Festival. Kay won Best Musical Variety Act at the 2014 London Cabaret Awards and has been named by the Evening Standard as one of London's most influential people.

He has performed songs on the topical BBC Radio 4 series The Now Show and has appeared on numerous TV shows, such as The Russell Howard Hour on Sky One, BBC Breakfast, Lorraine, Peston on Sunday and 8 Out of 10 Cats Does Countdown.

Personal life
Kay is gay, and was voted in Pink News top 50 most influential LGBT Twitter users. Kay lives in Oxfordshire, with his husband, Game of Thrones executive James Farrell, and their Airedale terrier, Pip.

In his book Undoctored: The Story of a Medic Who Ran Out of Patients Kay revealed that he was raped at a sauna in Auckland in 2012.

Bibliography 

 2017, This Is Going to Hurt, Picador 
 2019, Twas the Nightshift before Christmas, Picador 
 2020, Adam Kay and Henry Paker, Kay's Anatomy: A Complete (and Completely Disgusting) Guide to the Human Body, '''' Delacorte Press 
 2021, Kay's Marvellous Medicine: A Gross and Gruesome History of the Human Body, Puffin 
 2022, Undoctored: The Story of a Medic Who Ran Out of Patients, 
 2022, Dear NHS: 100 Stories to Say Thank You,'' Trapeze 
 2023, (world book day) Kay’s brilliant brains

References

External links 

 
 

1980 births
Living people
People educated at Dulwich College
British comedy writers
British comedians
English Jewish writers
English people of Polish descent
Gay comedians
English gay writers
LGBT Jews
21st-century LGBT people
People from Brighton